Youens is a surname. Notable people with the surname include:

Bernard Youens (1914–1984), British actor
Frederick Youens (1892–1917), British World War I veteran
John Youens (1914–1993), British Anglican priest and army officer
Laurence Youens (1873–1939), British Roman Catholic bishop
Peter Youens (1916–2000), British diplomat 
Susan Youens (born 1947), American musicologist